Xavier Lenogue (born 27 December 1996) is a Martiniquais professional footballer who plays as a goalkeeper for  club Sedan.

Club career
Lenogue made his professional debut with Auxerre in a 0–0 draw against Brest.

International career 
In March 2022, Lenogue was selected with the Martinique national team.

References

1996 births
Living people
Sportspeople from Fort-de-France
Association football goalkeepers
Martiniquais footballers
French footballers
French people of Martiniquais descent
Black French sportspeople
Ligue 2 players
Championnat National 2 players
Championnat National 3 players
AJ Auxerre players
Pau FC players
Saint-Pryvé Saint-Hilaire FC players
CS Sedan Ardennes players